Meet the Wildcat is an American 1940 mystery film directed by Arthur Lubin starring Ralph Bellamy and Margaret Lindsay.

Plot
One day in Mexico, magazine photographer Ann Larkin is in a museum when she happens to see a man steal a painting. Pursuing and accusing him, she believes the man, Brod Williams, to be a notorious art thief known only as "The Wildcat."

Brod brings the stolen painting to Leon Dumeray, a gallery owner. Dumeray recognizes it as stolen property and notifies the police, who place Brod under arrest. Ann comes to visit Brod in jail, but after complying with his request to bring him a pineapple from a local fruit stand, she is shocked to find a gun has been hidden inside it. Brod makes a daring escape, forcing Ann to switch clothing with him and fleeing the jail dressed as a woman.

Law authorities later congratulate Brod on his scheme. He is actually a police detective from New York City who is trying to smoke out Dumeray, who is the real Wildcat. He is offered a job by Dumeray, who now trusts Brod to be a dishonest man. Ann, however, doesn't know Dumeray is the thief and tips him off to Brod's true identity. Dumeray takes both as his prisoners, but Brod breaks free and calls for the police.

Cast
 Ralph Bellamy as Lt. Brad Williams
 Margaret Lindsay as Ann Larkin
 Joseph Schildkraut as Leon Dumeray
 Allen Jenkins as Max Schwydel
 Jerome Cowan as Digby Vanderhood III
 Rudolph Anders as Feral - Henchman
 Frank Puglia as Chief of Police
 Guy D'Ennery as Mordaunt - Henchman
 Hans Herbert as Marco - Henchman
 Juan de la Cruz as National Museum Director
 Reed Hadley as Basso - Henchman
 Gloria Hadley as Annabelle Lee
 Iris Adrian as Jail Cell Blonde

Production
Filming started August 1940. Bellamy was cast shortly before filming began.

Reception
The New York Times called it "an obvious picture" but one that was "deftly and amusingly played" and "breezes along at a smooth pace."

Diabolique magazine called it "a really fun mystery comedy with  Margaret Lindsay in superb form as a photographer convinced Ralph Bellamy (miscast, trying to channel Cary Grant) is an art thief."

References

External links

Meet the Wildcat at BFI

Meet the Wildcat at Letterbox DVD

1940 films
1940 mystery films
Films directed by Arthur Lubin
American mystery films
American black-and-white films
1940s English-language films
1940s American films